Avignon—La Mitis—Matane—Matapédia is a federal electoral district in Quebec. It encompasses a portion of Quebec previously included in the electoral districts of Gaspésie—Îles-de-la-Madeleine (21%) and Haute-Gaspésie—La Mitis—Matane—Matapédia (79%).

Avignon—La Mitis—Matane—Matapédia was created by the 2012 federal electoral boundaries redistribution and was legally defined in the 2013 representation order. It came into effect upon the call of the 42nd Canadian federal election, which took place October 19, 2015.

Profile
The Bloc did the best, with results from the 2011 election transposed onto the new riding boundaries from the redistribution. Their stronghold in the riding is in and around Mont-Joli, and for the most part, they carried the rural areas, particularly in the northern portion of the district. The NDP's strength was in the south, in the part of the new riding taken from Gaspésie—Îles-de-la-Madeleine. The area around Amqui offered the most diverse range of support, with all parties doing fairly well, but with the Bloc coming out on top. Matane, and the rural regions surrounding it, were the best portions of the seat for the Liberals, although they had to contend with strong support for the Bloc as well.

Demographics

According to the Canada 2016 Census

 Languages (2016 mother tongue) : 95.8% French, 3.3% English, 0.6% Mi'kmaq, 0.1% Arabic, 0.1% Spanish

Members of Parliament

This riding has elected the following Members of Parliament:

Election results

References

Quebec federal electoral districts
Matane
Carleton-sur-Mer